Triprolidine is an over-the-counter antihistamine with anticholinergic properties. It is used to combat the symptoms associated with allergies and is sometimes combined with other cold medications designed to provide general relief for flu-like symptoms. As with many antihistamines, the most common side effect is drowsiness.

It was patented in 1948 and came into medical use in 1953.

See also 
Benztropine
Pseudoephedrine
UK-9040

References 

Alkene derivatives
H1 receptor antagonists
Muscarinic antagonists
2-Pyridyl compounds
Pyrrolidines
4-Tolyl compounds